Mojtaba Minovi (February 1903 Tehran – January 1977, Tehran), was an Iranian historian, literary scholar and professor of Tehran University. He was a participant in the Ferdowsi Millenary celebrations in 1934 in Tehran.

References

1903 births
Academic staff of the University of Tehran
20th-century Iranian historians
Iranian literary scholars
1977 deaths
Researchers of Persian literature
Shahnameh Researchers